Athletic Club Barnechea is a Chilean Football club based in the Lo Barnechea commune of Santiago, Chile. They currently play in the second level of Chilean football, the Primera B.

History

Early Years (1929–1983)
The club was founded on December 23, 1929, as Club Deportivo Santa Rosa Lo Barnechea. Its name was changed to Deportivo Lo Barnechea in 1943.

Cuarta División (1983–1988)
Barnechea was part of the first season of the Chilean Cuarta División in 1983, where it played until 1988. A second-place finish behind Municipal Las Condes that season saw Barnechea promoted to the Chilean Tercera División.

Tercera División (1988–2011)
In the 2009–10 season the team played the Liguilla de Ascenso, finishing in 3rd place behind Trasandino and Magallanes.

The next season saw Barnechea win the Third Division, finishing 1st in the Liguilla de Ascenso, above Arturo Fernández Vial, Iberia Los Ángeles and Municipal Mejillones.

Primera División B (2011–2014)
In 2011–12 it played the Chilean Primera División B, finishing in 2nd place with 66 points. It won a place to play the two-legged promotion final against the third-placed Ñublense. After both the first leg (1–1) and second leg (2–2) finished in draws, the play-off went to penalties, where Barnechea lost 7–6.

The club had a final chance at promotion in the relegation play-off against the 16th-placed team of the Chilean Primera División, Cobresal. Barnechea won the first leg 3–1 at the Estadio Santa Laura with goals from Ignacio Caroca and Francisco Ibañez adding to an Eduardo Farías own goal. Agustín Vuletich scored for Cobresal. However, it lost the return leg 3–0 at Estadio El Cobre with a goal from Eduardo Martinez and two from Jose Miguel Cuéllar.

In the season 2013–14, AC Barnechea finished in 4th place with 59 points and won a place in the Play-off for the Second Promotion to the First Division. They defeated Santiago Morning in the semi-finals, winning 2–1 over two legs. In the finals against San Luis, Barnechea won the first leg 1–0 but lost the return fixture by the same score. Their captain and goalkeeper Jorge Manduca scored the decisive penalty in the resulting shoot-out to send Barnechea through to the Chilean Primera División 2014–15 by a 4–3 margin.

Primera Division (2014–2015)
On August 3, 2014, Nicolas Maturana scored Barnechea's first-ever goal in the top flight against Audax Italiano. A week later, Barnechea won their first match in the First Division, with Francisco Ibañez scoring the only goal in a 1–0 win against San Marcos de Arica.

The club were relegated to Chilean Primera Division B at the end of the 2014–15 season after finishing 18th.

Primera División B (2015–2018)
Back to the second category, the team started with a triumph before Deportes Concepción, followed by a tie as a visitor to Deportes Iberia and other local before Ñublense. But already in the fourth date, began to notice the fragility of the game – except the win 5–2 before Deportes La Serena as a visitor at the sixth date – where the results did not accompany and the game nor
After the bad campaign, where the team was 13 dates without win. While they had a light of hope from the dates 20 and 21, the fall before the champion of the meeting, Deportes Temuco returned to its dark reality, such that the left trembling throughout this stage, until the equipment that came from further back, began to win games and obtain important points in his fight to save the category. The defeat before Coquimbo Unido of visit by 4–2 in the last date, determined its eventual decline to the third category of Chilean soccer, with a meager statistics only 5 wins, 8 draws and 17 defeats, with 25 goals in favor and 54 against, which gave him a difference of −29 and a figure of 23 points of 90 possible (its final performance was a 25.56%), ending the team in the 16th position (last), being relegated to the Segunda División for the season 2016–17. In the following season, the team won the Segunda División, being promoted to the Primera B for 2017, and in 2018, the team reached the semifinals of the Copa Chile for the first time in its history.

Titles
Segunda División: 1
2016-17
Tercera División: 1
2011

Seasons played
1 season in Primera División
4 seasons in Primera División B
1 season in Segunda División
23 seasons in Tercera División A
6 seasons in Tercera División B

Current squad

2021 Winter Transfers

In

Out

Managers
 Nelson Soto (2010)
 Mario Salas (2010–12)
 Hugo Vilches (2013–2014)
 Francisco Bozán (2014–15)
 Jorge Contreras (2016–17)
 Arturo Norambuena (2017–2018)
 René Ávila (2018)
 Hernán Peña (2018)
 Louis Povell (2019-Present)

See also
Chilean football league system

External links
Barnechea F.C. Official website
Team webpage at Tercera Division.cl (archived)

References

Football clubs in Chile
Association football clubs established in 1929
Sport in Santiago
1929 establishments in Chile